The Drewry-Mitchell-Moorer House is a historic mansion in Eufaula, Alabama, U.S.. It was built for Dr. John Drewry in 1867. It remained in the family until the 1970s, having been inherited by Drewry's daughter, Lilly Mitchell, followed by her son, A. C. Mitchell, and his daughter, Mrs. W. D. Moorer. It has been listed on the National Register of Historic Places since April 13, 1972.

References

Houses on the National Register of Historic Places in Alabama
Italianate architecture in Alabama
Houses completed in 1867
Houses in Barbour County, Alabama